Yunxi Subdistrict is a subdistrict and the seat of Yunxi District in Yueyang Prefecture-level City, Hunan, China. It was reformed as a town through the amalgamation of Chengjiao Township, Yunxi Town and the former Yunxi Town on November 30, 2015 and reorganized as a subdistrict in 2017. Through the amalgamation of village-level divisions in 2016, the town has 13 villages and 13 communities. Its seat is Fengtaishan Community.

Subdivisions

References

Yunxi District
Subdistricts of Hunan
County seats in Hunan